Feodor Veiss (also Friedrich Karl Veiss; 25 April 1888 – 1940 Germany) was an Estonian politician. He was a member of V Riigikogu. He was a member of the Riigikogu since 1 April 1933. He replaced Aleksei Sorokin.

References

1888 births
1940 deaths
Members of the Riigikogu, 1932–1934